Allan Fakir (1932– 4 July 2000) (Sindhi: علڻ فقيرُ, Urdu: علن فقیر), was a Pakistani folk singer. He was particularly known for his ecstatic style of performance, marked with extreme devotional rhetoric and Sufi dance-singing.

Early life

Allan Fakir was born in 1932 in the Aamari in Jamshoro District, Sindh. Allan's mother died soon after giving birth. He spent his childhood in Manjhand, a town between Sehwan and Hyderabad, Sindh.

He belonged to Mangrasi tribe. According to the traditions of this caste, Allan Fakir's father used to beat the drum and sing traditional songs at weddings and Faqir's brothers still do the same job.

Fakir is an Arabic word, and implies a Sufi or a mystic. Thus in the real sense of the word, a 'Fakir' is someone who leads an independent life marked by piety, abstinence from material needs, and contentment in the available resources. It must not be confused with the rather loose usage of the same word implying a beggar, in the local languages Sindhi and Urdu.

Allan's memory was quite sharp, even though, he could not read and write. He was very touched hearing the traditional 'Latifi Raag' every night. Encouraged by Faqir Zawar Qurban Ali Lanjwani and Moolchand Maharaj, Allan Fakir began singing Bhitai's poetry at the shrine and ultimately spent next twenty years there, until meeting with [Abdul Karim Baloch ] who introduced him to Radio Pakistan and Pakistan Television Corporation in Hyderabad, Sindh and helped him to learn the correct pronunciation of Bhitai's poetry.

Eventually, Allan became a performing legend.

Super-hit songs

 He sang a duet with pop singer Muhammad Ali Shehki, "Allah Allah Kar Bhayya, Humma Humma". 
 A patriotic song "Itne bare jeewan saagar mein tu nein Pakistan diya, O' Allah, O' Allah" Sung by Allan Fakir, lyrics by Jamiluddin Aali, music by Niaz Ahmed- A Pakistan Television Corporation, Karachi production (1973)

Honors and awards
 
Allan Fakir received the following awards:
 President's Pride of Performance award in 1980
 Bukhari Award in 1984
 Shahbaz Award in 1987
 Shah Latif Award in 1992
 Kandhkot Award in 1993

Death
Allan Faqir died on 4 July 2000, at Liaqat National Hospital, Karachi. He left behind his wife, 3 sons and 2 daughters.

See also
 Shah Abdul Latif Bhittai
 Shaikh Ayaz

References

External links
OPF Almanac, Allan Fakir's Profile at Overseas Pakistanis Foundation website, Retrieved 13 Nov 2016

1932 births
2000 deaths
20th-century Pakistani male singers
Pakistani folk singers
Sindhi people
Performers of Sufi music
People from Jamshoro District
Sindhi-language singers
Pakistani Sufis
Recipients of the Pride of Performance
Singers from Sindh
Recipients of Latif Award